Lidio Cipriani (17 March 18928 October 1962) was an anthropologist, university teacher and explorer from Florence.

Education and academia
He made his doctorate in Natural Science, became docente of Anthropology at the University of Florence and Director of the Istituto e Museo Nazionale di Antropologia in the same university. In 1924 Cipriani was awarded the International Broca Prize of Paris for Anthropology. He distinguished himself by a long period of exploration and field work in several continents and among a large number of tribes and population of Africa, Southwest Asia and India.

Research
As an exponent of the anthropometric school, Cipriani was particularly interested in systematic measurements (cranial, but also of hands, feet, and all other kinds of body parts), and he was also fond of making plaster facial moulds made from life, for which he procured models among the populations he encountered.

Cipriani's three journeys in Africa were documented by a large number of photographs and the chronicle was reported in his book In Africa dal Capo al Cairo (‘In Africa from the Cape to Cairo’) (1932): over 600 pages of anthropological, zoological, botanical and geological information.

His Indian work started in the South, in collaboration with the late Prof. Anantha K. Iyer and his work on the physical anthropology of the Toda (Arch. per l'Antrop. e la Etnol. LXVII, 1937 XV) and of the Coorg, Kuruba, Ierava etc. (Idem, LXV, 1935) throws new light on these populations. Later, as a Foreign Fellow of the Anthropological Survey of India he collaborated with the late Dr. B. S. Guha in his work on the Onge of Little Andaman Island. Cipriani died in his native Florence at the age of seventy on the 8 October 1962. A committed fascist, Cipriani was one of the authors of the Manifesto of Race, published on 14 July 1938 in Il Giornale d'Italia. He began working at the Racial Office and contributing to Telesio Interlandi's journal La difesa della razza almost from its inception.

Works 
 
 
 The Andaman Islanders. By Lidio Cipriani. Edited and translated by D. Taylor Cox, assisted by Linda Cole. New York: Frederick A. Praeger. 1966.

References

External links
 

Italian anthropologists
People from the Province of Florence
1892 births
1962 deaths
Italian explorers
Italian fascists